La Esperanza is a census-designated place (CDP) in Starr County, Texas, United States. It is a new CDP formed from part of the former Los Villareales CDP prior to the 2010 census with a population of 229.

Geography
La Esperanza is located at  (26.431313, -98.892272).

Education
It is in the Roma Independent School District.

References

Census-designated places in Starr County, Texas
Census-designated places in Texas